The Rural Municipality of Beaver River No. 622 is a rural municipality (RM) in the Canadian province of Saskatchewan within Census Division No. 17 and  Division No. 6. It is located in the northwest-central portion of the province. The RM of Beaver River No. 622 is the highest numbered rural municipality in Saskatchewan.

History 
The RM of Beaver River No. 622 incorporated as a rural municipality on January 1, 1978.

Geography

Communities and localities 
The following urban municipalities are surrounded by the RM.

Villages
Goodsoil
Pierceland

The Big Island Lake Cree Territory is within the RM, as is the Ministikwan 161A First Nations Indian reserves and Thunderchild First Nation territories.

Demographics 

Government 
The RM of Beaver River No. 622 is governed by an elected municipal council and an appointed administrator that meets on the third Thursday of every month. The reeve of the RM is Kevin Turchyn while its administrator is Sharon Stacey. The RM's office is located in Pierceland.

References 

B
Division No. 17, Saskatchewan